Jellico may refer to:

Jellico, Tennessee
Edward Jellico, a Star Trek character
 Captain Jellico from the Solar Queen novel series by Andre Norton

See also 
Jellicoe (disambiguation)